The 2011 Arizona Wildcats baseball team represented the University of Arizona in the 2011 NCAA Division I baseball season. The Wildcats played their home games for the final season at Jerry Kindall Field at Frank Sancet Stadium. Following the season, the team would move to the off-campus Hi Corbett Field. The team was coached by Andy Lopez in his 10th season at Arizona.

Personnel

Roster

Coaches

Opening day

Schedule and results

College Station Regional

2011 MLB draft

References 

Arizona
Arizona Wildcats baseball seasons
Arizona baseball